Hardwicke Bay is a bay in the Australian state of  South Australia located on the west coast of Yorke Peninsula in Spencer Gulf.

Extent & description
Hardwicke Bay is located on the west coast of the Yorke Peninsula within Spencer Gulf in South Australia.  It lies between the headland of Corny Point at its southern extremity and the southern end of Wardang Island at its northern extremity.
The bay is reported as being suitable as an anchorage where there is a need to shelter from southerly winds, particularly as most parts of the bay has rocky bottom suitable for anchoring on.
The bay’s coastline consists generally of sandy beaches that rise into low sandhills with a woodland cover with occasional rocky headlands.
As of 2005, navigation aids within Hardwicke Bay include the Corny Point Lighthouse at the Corny Point headland and a light on Wardang Island.

History
The bay was named after the Earl of Hardwicke by the British navigator, Matthew Flinders on 19 March 1802.

Settlements and port infrastructure
Settlements located on the coast of Hardwicke Bay (from south west to north east) within localities include the following - Corny Point, The Pines, Point Turton, Hardwicke Bay, Bluff Beach, Port Rickaby and  Port Victoria.
Port infrastructure within the bay consists of jetties and boat ramps.  Jetties are located at Point Turton, Port Rickaby and Port Victoria.  Boat ramps are located (from the south west to north east) at The Pines, Point Souttar, Point Turton, the settlement of Hardwicke Bay, Port Minlacowie, Bluff Beach, Port Rickaby and Port Victoria.

Economic use
As of 2013, three areas within the southern end of the bay have been zoned under state planning legislation for aquaculture.  As of 2011, part of the north end of the bay was proposed for aquaculture under the name of the “Point Pearce prospective aquaculture zone.”

Protected area status
Protected areas located within and adjoining the bay’s extent include the following.  The Eastern Spencer Gulf Marine Park occupies the northern end of the bay as far south as Wauraltee Beach.  The Southern Spencer Gulf Marine Park occupies the southern end of the bay.  The Leven Beach Conservation Park adjoins part of the south coast of the bay to the immediate west of the settlement at Point Turton.

See also
Hardwick (disambiguation)

Citations and references

Citations

References

Bays of South Australia
Spencer Gulf
Yorke Peninsula